In musical genre, battle music may refer to:
 Battle music (video game music), a type of video game music
 Battle music (heavy metal music), a type of heavy metal music
 Battle music, an imitative compositional style found in Renaissance music